The Perfect Element, Part I is Pain of Salvation's third studio album, released in October 2000. It is a concept album that focuses on the forming of the individual, particularly on the events from one's childhood and adolescence. It is the first segment of a planned three-part concept.  The Perfect Element, Part II was released in 2007 under the title Scarsick.

Overview
"The album is in a way a blend of the two earlier albums, with the groove and originality of Entropia and the focus, thoroughness and production of One Hour by the Concrete Lake. However, it will be quite unique as an album."

Analysis
The Perfect Element, Part I is the first part of a planned, two-piece concept, and is divided into three chapters, each containing four tracks.

Part one of the concept is a story of human development, which focuses specifically on the progression from childhood to adolescence.  It contains many themes within its context which include:

Child abuse (sexual and physical)
Sexuality
Tragedy
Drug abuse
Love
Pain
Anger
Loss (of life and innocence, among other things)
Shame
Regret
Despair
Inner struggles

All these themes are dealt with as the story explores the lives of two characters, one male and one female (known commonly as "He" and "She") who are broken, dysfunctional people.  They meet in the events of the song "Ashes" after the first two songs of the album present us with a depiction of their troubled pasts ("Used" for "He" and in "In the Flesh" for "She"). After that introduction, the concept focuses on the inner struggles and feelings of the characters after the events on "Ashes", and we also have some memory flashes, telling us more about their pasts and revealing what events in their lives caused them to become what they are, finally ending with the "falling" of He on the last song, "The Perfect Element".

Track listing
All lyrics by Daniel Gildenlöw. All music and arrangements by Daniel Gildenlöw except the middle part of "Her Voices" by Daniel Gildenlöw and Fredrik Hermansson, and the "Once..." part of "The Perfect Element" by Daniel Gildenlöw and Johan Langell. String arrangements by Daniel Gildenlöw and Fredrik Hermansson.

Concept, lyrics and artwork by Daniel Gildenlöw.

A Limited Edition has been also released with an extra cd including bonus tracks and multimedia application containing videos ("Ashes", "Exclamation") and additional material/information.

Extra CD:

1. "Beyond the Mirror" - 8:20
2. "Never Learn to Fly" - 5:10
3. "Time Weaver’s Tale" - 6:19
4. (PC multimedia track with videos, photos, interview, additional information/material and hidden area)

Personnel
Daniel Gildenlöw – lead vocals, guitar, producer, mixing, mastering
Kristoffer Gildenlöw  – bass, backing vocals
Johan Hallgren – guitar, backing vocals, mixing
Fredrik Hermansson – keyboards, Steinway and samples
Johan Langell – drums, backing vocals, mixing, mastering

Additional personnel
Anders "Theo" Theander – producer, engineering
Pontus Lindmark – engineering
Mihai Cucu – strings
Camilla Andersson – strings
Petter Axelsson – strings
Gretel Gradén – strings
Johnny Björk – strings
Daniel Gildenlöw/Gildenlöw MultiMedia – artwork
Elin Iggsten – photos
Johanna Iggsten – photos
Fredrik Hallgren – photos

References

Pain of Salvation albums
2000 albums
Inside Out Music albums
Concept albums